The Asiatic Journal and Monthly Register for  British India and its Dependencies was a regular publication which aimed to be “a faithful register of Indian Occurrences”.

About the Journal
The journal was sponsored by the East India Company, and was designed to record and share information relating to India and the East India Company, and covered a broad range of commercial, political and cultural content. The journal was printed for Black, Parbury and Allen, booksellers to the East India Company.

The preface of the first volume states its aims: 
'The convenience and gratification of that extensive portion of the British Public, which either at home or abroad is connected with our Indian dominions, have been the objects pursued in the projection and conduct of the Asiatic Journal.

It was obvious, that while the East-Indies opened to every British reader, and especially to every one immediately interested in its concerns, the widest field of useful and liberal information, there was much which could only be explored and detailed in a work expressly devoted to those objects.

The journal was issued for almost forty years, from 1816 to 1845, in three series, each with a different name:
 1816-1829 - Series 1: The Asiatic Journal and Monthly Register for British India and its Dependencies 
 1830-1843 - Series 2: The Asiatic Journal and Monthly Register for British and Foreign India, China, and Australasia
 1843-1845 - Series 3: The Asiatic Journal and Monthly Miscellany

Contents
The contents of the journal were arranged in sections titled:
 Original Communications
 Memoirs of Eminent Persons
 History, Antiquities, Poetry
 Natural History, Geography
 Review of New Publications
 Debates at the East-India House
 Proceedings at the East India Colleges of Hertford and Fort William, and Military Seminary
 India Military and Commercial Intelligence
 Appointments, Promotions, Resignations, &c.
 Births, Marriages and Deaths
 East India Shipping Intelligence, Arrivals and Departures, Lists of Passengers to and from India
 Ship Letter-Mails
 London Markets
 Notices of Sales at the East-India House
 Times appointed for the East-India Company’s Ships for the Season
 Prices Current of East-India Produce
 India Exchanges and Company’s Securities
 Daily Prices of Stocks, &c. &c.

See also
 Company rule in India
 Families In British India Society

References

External links
 The Asiatic Journal, series 1 (1816-1829) - digitized
 The Asiatic Journal, series 2 (1830-1843) - digitized
 The Asiatic Journal, series 3 (1843-1845) - digitized

British East India Company
Magazines established in 1816
Magazines disestablished in 1845
Defunct magazines published in the United Kingdom
Monthly magazines published in the United Kingdom